Dennis Edward Myers (November 10, 1905 – May 30, 1957) was an American football player and coach.  He attended the University of Iowa, where he played college football for the Hawkeyes.  He then signed with the Chicago Bears of the National Football League (NFL) and played two games as a guard with the team in 1931.  Myers served as the head football coach at Boston College from 1941 to 1942 and again from 1946 to 1950, compiling a record of 35–27–4.

Coaching career
Myers left the NFL after one year and was hired as line coach at West Virginia University under Greasy Neale.  Neale and Myers both moved to Yale University in 1934 to assist Ducky Pond.  In 1936, Myers took the line coaching job at Brown University, where he worked for five years under Tuss McLaughry. On March 14, 1941, Myers was announced as the head football coach at Boston College, replacing Frank Leahy, who had left to coach the Notre Dame Fighting Irish. In his first two seasons, Myers posted records of 7–3 and 8–2 and led Boston College to the 1943 Orange Bowl, where the Eagles lost to Alabama, 37–21.  In 1943, Myers left Boston College to serve in the United States Navy. After being discharged, he returned to Boston College.  He posted three winning seasons from 1946 to 1948 and a 4–4–1 campaign in 1949, but was fired after a winless season in 1950.  In seven seasons at Boston College, Myers compiled a record of 35–27–4.

Head coaching record

See also
 List of college football head coaches with non-consecutive tenure

References

External links
 

1905 births
1957 deaths
American football guards
Boston College Eagles football coaches
Brown Bears football coaches
Chicago Bears players
Iowa Hawkeyes football players
West Virginia Mountaineers football coaches
Yale Bulldogs football coaches
United States Navy personnel of World War II
United States Navy officers
People from Algona, Iowa
Military personnel from Iowa